Saidabad (also Romanized as Sa‘īdābād and Saiyidābād; also known as Seyyedābād) is a village in Kavir Rural District, Deyhuk District, Tabas County, South Khorasan Province, Iran. At the 2006 census, its population was 74, in 16 families.

References 

Populated places in Tabas County